Mäebe may refer to several places in Estonia:
Mäebe, Saare County, village in Estonia
Mäebe, former name of Viidu-Mäebe village, Saare County, village in Estonia